Ariel Forman (November 21, 1943 – February 19, 2016) was an Israeli actor and voice actor.

Biography
Born and raised in Tel Aviv, Forman began his career in the IDF serving in the Central Command Band along with Oshik Levi and other artists. After being discharged, he studied under the guidance of Uta Hagen and Stella Adler in New York City. Forman performed in many theatres across Israel and he had mainly performed at the Habima Theatre between 1971 and 1975. Forman was also a participant in several Yiddish-speaking plays and acted on films and television as well. He made his debut film appearance in Sallah Shabati featuring Chaim Topol.

Forman was also an expert voice dubber. He performed the Hebrew voice roles of King Triton in The Little Mermaid (except for the third film), Zeus in Hercules, Monsieur D'Arque in Beauty and the Beast, Lafayette in The Aristocats, King Hubert in Sleeping Beauty, John Silver in Treasure Planet, Francis in Oliver & Company and more.

Personal life
Forman had two sons, one of whom is an actor. He also had six grandchildren.

Death
Forman suffered from COPD, which resulted in lung cancer. He then succumbed to the effects in a Nahariya hospital on February 19, 2016, at the age of 72. He was laid to rest in a cemetery in Yas'ur.

References

External links

1943 births
2016 deaths
Male actors from Tel Aviv
Israeli male film actors
Israeli male stage actors
Israeli male television actors
Israeli male voice actors
Jewish Israeli male actors
20th-century Israeli male actors
21st-century Israeli male actors
Deaths from lung cancer in Israel
Deaths from chronic obstructive pulmonary disease